Jaan Kokk (20 December 1903 Mõniste Parish, Võru County – 10 April 1942 Sverdlovsk Prison, Russia) was an Estonian politician. He was a member of VI Riigikogu (its Chamber of Deputies).

References

1903 births
1942 deaths
Members of the Estonian National Assembly
Members of the Riigivolikogu
Estonian people who died in Soviet detention
People from Rõuge Parish